Lucas Martín Ceballos Carrizo (born 19 September 1990) is an Argentine professional footballer who plays as a forward for Estudiantes La Rioja.

Career
Ceballos started his senior career with Argentine Primera División team San Lorenzo, appearing on the bench once in the Copa Argentina versus Villa Dálmine. In 2012, Ceballos signed for Torneo Argentino B's Américo Tesorieri. He scored eight goals in twenty-four games in his debut season with Américo as they were relegated to Torneo Argentino C, he soon left to join Dock Sud of Primera C Metropolitana on loan. He returned to Américo in 2014 with the club now in the Torneo Federal A; due to the system changes in 2014. He scored in his next appearance, getting Américo's goal in a 5–1 defeat to Unión Villa Krause.

Forty-one games and two campaigns later, Ceballos departed and subsequently signed for Primera B Metropolitana club Deportivo Armenio. His professional debut came on 8 February 2016 in a match against Estudiantes. Four further appearances followed during the 2016 season, prior to him leaving to join Andino of Torneo Federal B on 30 June. Across the next three years, Ceballos had a second stint with Américo Tesorieri, as well as short spell with Rioja Juniors in early 2020. In the succeeding August, Ceballos joined Estudiantes La Rioja of Liga Riojana; a club managed by his father, Isidro.

Personal life
Ceballos's father, Isidro, was also a professional footballer; notably in the Primera División for Instituto.

Career statistics
.

References

External links
 

1990 births
Living people
Sportspeople from La Rioja Province, Argentina
Argentine footballers
Association football forwards
Torneo Argentino B players
Torneo Argentino C players
Torneo Federal A players
Primera C Metropolitana players
Primera B Metropolitana players
San Lorenzo de Almagro footballers
Club Atlético Américo Tesorieri players
Sportivo Dock Sud players
Deportivo Armenio footballers
Andino Sport Club players